The Giebichenstein in Stöckse, Germany, is one of the largest erratic boulders of northern Germany. It is in a city called Landkreis Nienburg/Weser. It weighs around 330 tons. A picture of the Giebichenstein is part of the emblem of the Stöckse municipality.

There is the supposition that during Wolstonian Stage the stone was deposited by glaciers as a part of a moraine. Near the Giebichenstein there are the remains of a dolmen, and at the stone itself there were found the remains of a Stone Age hunter's camp.

Historical geology
Glaciology
Rock formations of Lower Saxony
Funnelbeaker culture
Glacial erratics of Germany